Viva il cinema! is a 1952 Italian comedy film directed by Giorgio Baldaccini and Enzo Trapani.

Cast
 Delia Scala as Palmina  
 Fiorenzo Fiorentini as Tonino  
 Virgilio Riento as Gambalesta
 Corrado Alba as Ugo  
 Marilyn Buferd as Tina  
 Carlo Campanini as Sé stesso  
 Walter Chiari as Sé stesso 
 Bruno Corelli as Mario  
 Lianella Carell as Gertrude Edelweiss  
 Carlo Dapporto as Ferdinando D'Alba  
 Nyta Dover as Franca  
 Jole Fierro as Paola  
 Dante Maggio as Ciccillo  
 Nino Manfredi as Amico di Tonino  
 Lois Maxwell
 Marisa Merlini as Jacqueline  
 Alberto Sorrentino as Giovanni
 Silvana Pampanini as Herself
 Enzo Cerusico
 Checco Durante
 Arnoldo Foà as Producer 
 Guglielmo Inglese
 Luigi Pavese
 Enrico Luzi
 Enzo Maggio 
 Paul Muller
 Rossana Podestà
 Luisa Rivelli 
 Giacomo Rondinella
 Gisella Sofio

External links
 

1952 films
1950s Italian-language films
Italian comedy films
1952 comedy films
Italian black-and-white films
1950s Italian films